Pedro Alejandro Romo Dávalos (born May 6, 1989) is an Ecuadorian football midfielder who plays for Gualaceo SC.

Club career
A product of LDU Quito's youth system, he began making senior club appearances for Liga in 2008, and was included in the squad roster for the 2009 Recopa Sudamericana and the 2009 Copa Sudamericana.

Honors
LDU Quito
Serie A: 2010

References

External links
FEF card 

1989 births
Living people
Footballers from Quito
Association football midfielders
Ecuadorian footballers
L.D.U. Quito footballers
S.D. Aucas footballers
C.D. ESPOLI footballers
Delfín S.C. footballers
Manta F.C. footballers